The Dominican College of Psychologists, known as Colegio Dominicano de Psicólogos or CODOPSI (due to its initials in Spanish) is the institution that regulates the practice of Psychology in the Dominican Republic.

History

Dominican Association of Psychology (ADOPSI) 
Before the CODOPSI was created, the study of Psychology in the Dominican Republic was promoted by the Dominican Association of Psychology (ADOPSI). This entity was founded in 1976 and its main focus was to promote Psychology in the Dominican Republic by holding events and looking for ways to integrate psychologists and their studies into Dominican society.

The ADOPSI held 11 symposiums around the country, in which they highlighted the contributions of Psychology and why these were relevant to society. In 1981, under the guidance of Elizabeth De Windt and with the collaboration of the Interamerican Psychological Society, the ADOPSI held the XVIII Interamerican Congress of Psychology.

In the year 2000, the ADOPSI stopped its efforts as it was replaced by the Dominican College of Psychologists.

Law 22-01 
In 2001 the executive power of the Dominican Republic put into effect law No. 22-01 which created the legal basis for the College of Psychologists to be funded. This law states that:The Dominican College of Psychologists is invested with legal personality and its own assets for an undefined period of time. Its legal domicile will be located in the city of Santo Domingo, the capital of the Dominican Republic. It will function in conformity with the goals established by this law, the ethics, discipline, and the statutes of its code.The law also covers the requirements for the legal practice of Psychology in the Dominican Republic, the ethics and disciplinary guidelines for psychologists, and the sanctions in case of infringement.

The CODOPSI 
The first president of the College of Psychologists was Rolando Tabar Manzur who highlighted the connection of the College with the Dominican Association of Psychology (ADOPSI). Tabar Manzur also promoted the importance of psychologists and psychological studies in society.

Legal Practice of Psychology 
The main requirement to practice Psychology in the Dominican Republic is to obtain a Exequator (from Latin, meaning to ‘let them (referring to an individual) perform’). To obtain the Exequator the person applying needs a valid university degree at a bachelor level, be a member of the CODOPSI, and fulfill a set of required legal documents (such as copies of a university degree, letter addressed to the President of the Dominican Republic, and a certificate from the Office of the Attorney General of the Republic of no criminal record).

Events 
Throughout the years both the ADOPSI and the CODOPSI have held events for the promotion of Psychology and psychological knowledge in the Dominican Republic:

References

External Links 

 http://www.idpp.org/idpp_pubs/codopsi/codetica.pdf

Educational organizations based in the Dominican Republic
Dominican Republic psychologists
+Scientists